Warlock is a Western novel by American author Oakley Hall, first published in 1958. The story is set in the early 1880s, in a fictional southwestern mining town called Warlock and its vicinity. The novel's characters and many elements of its plot are loosely based on actual people and events from Tombstone, Arizona during the same time period, including Wyatt Earp and the Gunfight at the O.K. Corral. It has been described as a precursor to, or early example of, the revisionist western, due to its moral ambiguity and satirical commentary on Cold-War-era American society. The novel was a finalist for the 1958 Pulitzer Prize.

Hall's subsequent novels The Bad Lands (1978) and Apaches (1986) are sequels to Warlock, though they do not portray the same principal characters or setting. The three novels together form the Legends West trilogy.

In 1959, Warlock was adapted into a film of the same name starring Henry Fonda, Richard Widmark and Anthony Quinn.

Plot
When violence threatens the frontier boomtown of Warlock, a Citizens' Committee determines to take action against criminal cowboys and cattle rustlers. A gunslinger named Clay Blaisedell, who has achieved considerable renown in Texas, is hired as town marshal to keep the peace. He is followed to Warlock by his close friend Tom Morgan, a gambler and saloon owner with a sour reputation, and Kate Dollar, a former prostitute bent on vengeance. Though Blaisedell at first manages to assert his authority with his stolid demeanor and expert gunmanship, Abe McQuown and his troublesome gang of cowboys seek to antagonize him.

One of McQuown's former associates, John "Bud" Gannon, hopes to repent for the horrors of his past by becoming a deputy sheriff in Warlock, while his younger brother Billy continues to ride with McQuown. Bud's decision unsettles both the gang and the town's citizens, and he is forced to confront suspicion about his loyalties from both sides while trying to maintain his official neutrality. When Blaisedell declares several of McQuown's company banned from Warlock, the outlaws disobey the posting and ride into town. Morgan saves Blaisedell from an ambush in the ensuing shootout, and three of the outlaws, including Billy Gannon, are killed. Much of the town expects Bud to retaliate against Blaisedell out of respect for his brother, but the deputy remains impartial. Anticipating the ferocity of rumor that will inevitably surround accounts of the gunfight and wanting to avoid the distrust and ressentiment of the town, Blaisedell turns himself in for trial in neighboring Bright's City on the charge of murder.

Meanwhile, employees of the local silver mines go on strike, demanding better pay and a new boss. Doctor Wagner, the town physician, is the miners' staunchest advocate, but implores them to organize a union and negotiate peacefully rather than resort to mob violence and sabotage. At the same time, the Citizens' Committee tries to avert open conflict by formally requesting Warlock's incorporation as the seat of a new county, which would permit them to hire their own full-time sheriff. They are discouraged by lengthy delays and the general reluctance of officials in Bright's City to hear their pleas, including the commander of the resident army detachment, General Peach, a decorated veteran of the Apache Wars whose senility borders on complete insanity. As tensions mount and rumors swirl, the concepts of morality and justice in the legal no-man's-land become ever more ambiguous.

Blaisedell is soon acquitted of murder but resigns his position as town marshal and begins dealing faro at Morgan's saloon. Kate Dollar takes an interest in Bud Gannon, seeking to use him to enact her retribution upon Blaisedell and Morgan for orchestrating the murder of her fiancé back in Texas.

Reception

Hall's most famous novel, Warlock was a finalist for the 1958 Pulitzer Prize, and has since been hailed as a classic of American West literature. Professor of English at the University of California, Irvine Michelle Latiolais described Warlock as belonging to the "pantheon of western masterpieces" alongside Cormac McCarthy's Blood Meridian and John Williams's Butcher's Crossing.

Writers Thomas Pynchon and Richard Fariña were especially fond of the novel, even dedicating what Pynchon called a "micro-cult" to it while students at Cornell University. Pynchon praised it for restoring "to the myth of Tombstone its full, mortal, blooded humanity", and for showing "that what is called society, with its law and order, is as frail, as precarious, as flesh and can be snuffed out and assimilated into the desert as easily as a corpse can. It is the deep sensitivity to abysses that makes Warlock one of our best American novels." Novelist Robert Stone  was also reportedly a fan.

References

1958 American novels
Western (genre) novels
American novels adapted into films
Novels set in Arizona
Cochise County conflict
Cultural depictions of Wyatt Earp
NYRB Classics